Tango & Cash is a 1989 American buddy cop action comedy film starring Sylvester Stallone, Kurt Russell, Jack Palance and Teri Hatcher. Stallone and Russell star as Raymond Tango and Gabriel Cash respectively, two rival LAPD narcotics detectives, who are forced to work together after the criminal mastermind Yves Perret (Palance) frames both of them for murder.

The film was chiefly directed by Andrei Konchalovsky, with Albert Magnoli and Peter MacDonald taking over in the later stages of filming, with Stuart Baird overseeing post-production. The multiple directors were due to a long and troubled production process, that included numerous script rewrites and clashes between Konchalovsky and producer Jon Peters over creative differences.

The film was released by Warner Bros. in the United States on December 22, 1989, the same day as Always. Both films were the last to be released by Hollywood in the 1980s. The film received mixed reviews from critics.

Plot
Beverly Hills LAPD Lieutenant Raymond Tango and Downtown Los Angeles Lieutenant Gabriel Cash are considered the two best cops in Los Angeles. They are opposites in almost every way and have an intense rivalry with each considering himself to be the best. Their actions often make headlines for their large drug busts through the Southern California area. Unbeknownst to them all the shipments actually belong to a single criminal organization headed by Yves Perret. After Tango's latest bust, Perret convinces his associates Quan and Lopez that the two officers have become a problem and they need to take care of it.

Perret, believing that having them killed is too quick and easy, develops an elaborate scheme to discredit and humiliate them before finally torturing them to death. Individually informed of a drug deal taking place later that night, the detectives meet for the first time at the location and discover a dead, wire-tapped body just as the FBI arrive and surround the duo. Agent Wyler finds Cash's backup pistol with attached suppressor on the floor and arrests them. At their murder trial, Tango and Cash are incriminated by an audio tape; verified in court by Skinner, an audio expert, it appears to reveal them shooting the undercover FBI agent after discussing a drug purchase. With the evidence stacked against them, they plead no contest to a lesser charge in exchange for reduced sentences in a minimum-security prison; instead, they get transported to a maximum-security prison and are housed with many of the criminals they had each arrested.

Once in prison, Tango and Cash are roused from their beds and tortured by Requin, Perret's henchman, and a gang of prisoners, until Matt Sokowski, the assistant warden and Cash's former commanding officer, rescues them. Sokowski recommends that they escape and provides them with a plan, but Tango opts out. When Cash tries to escape, he finds Sokowski murdered and is pursued by the guards. Tango rescues him and they head to the roof; Cash ziplines outside the prison walls, but Tango is attacked by the inmate "Face" before he can follow. Tango manages to electrocute Face by knocking him into a transformer before escaping. To clear their names, they separate; Tango tells Cash that if he needs to contact him, he can go to the Cleopatra Club and ask for "Katherine".

The detectives visit the witnesses who framed them in court. Tango intercepts Wyler, who admits that Requin was in charge of the setup; Wyler gets killed in a car bomb while trying to escape. Cash discovers that Skinner made the incriminating tape himself; he starts destroying Skinner's expensive equipment until he agrees to help exonerate them. Cash finds Katherine, Tango's sister who goes by "Kiki", but is quickly surrounded by cops; she helps Cash escape the night club by dressing him as a female. Later that night, Tango reunites with Cash and the duo are met at Kiki's house by Schroeder, Tango's commanding officer. He gives them Requin's address and tells them they have 24 hours to find out who he works for; Tango and Cash apprehend Requin and trick him into telling them Perret's name. Cash's weapons expert friend Owen lets them borrow a high-tech assault vehicle and the duo storm into Perret's headquarters to confront the crime lord. However, Perret has kidnapped Kiki and starts a timer that will trigger the building's automatic self-destruct procedure. After killing Perret's core security personnel and fellow crime lords, Requin appears, holding Kiki at knifepoint along with another of Perret's henchmen. He throws her aside to fight the detectives hand-to-hand. While Tango defeats the henchman in a martial arts fight, Cash stuffs a hand grenade down Requin's pants and knocks him down a flight of stairs as it explodes, killing him. Perret appears in a hall of mirrors holding a gun to Kiki's head; both detectives pick out the correct Perret and shoot him in the forehead. They gather Kiki and barely escape as the building explodes. They joke half-seriously about Cash's desire to date Kiki as a newspaper headline announces they've been completely vindicated and return to the LAPD as heroes.

Cast

 Sylvester Stallone as Lieutenant Raymond "Ray" Tango, LAPD Lieutenant and top cop of the Westside of Los Angeles. Tango drives a late model Cadillac, wears 3-piece Armani suits, makes a lot of money trading stocks and carries a small revolver (Smith & Wesson Model 36) as his service weapon. He also lives in a middle-class home where his younger sister rents a room from him.
 Kurt Russell as Lieutenant Gabriel "Gabe" Cash, LAPD Lieutenant and top cop of the Eastside of Los Angeles. Cash drives a classic Corvette, wears tattered clothing and cowboy boots (which have a shotgun built-in), and has long shaggy hair. He carries a large revolver (Ruger GP100) with an experimental laser sight, and lives in a bachelor pad apartment in a run-down neighborhood.
 Jack Palance as Yves Perret, crime lord of Southern California who arranges for Tango and Cash to be framed for murder.
 Teri Hatcher as Katherine "Kiki" Tango, Tango's younger sister and club dancer who rents a room in his house.
 Michael J. Pollard as Owen, Cash's weapon engineer friend. He provides Cash with his shotgun cowboy boots and several firearms and later the "RV from Hell".
 Brion James as Requin, Perret's ponytailed cockney henchman and courier.
 James Hong as Quan, the Los Angeles Triad chieftain and associate of Perret's.
 Robert Z'Dar as "Face", a psychotic convict who has a particular grudge against Tango for breaking "his ribs, his leg and his jaw".
 Marc Alaimo as Lopez, a Mexican Drug Cartel boss and associate of Perret's.
 Roy Brocksmith as FBI Agent Davis
 Phil Rubenstein as Matt Sokowski, Assistant Warden when Tango & Cash are in prison
 Lewis Arquette as FBI Agent Wyler
 Clint Howard as "Slinky", Tango's mental patient cellmate in prison.
 Michael Jeter as Skinner, sound engineer paid to implicate Tango and Cash.
 Geoffrey Lewis as Captain Schroeder, Tango's commanding officer.
 Edward Bunker as Captain Holmes, Cash's commanding officer.
 Xander Allan as Cucky (Coward) Snake Dog. A weak man,  who appears briefly in one scene. Although he has no dialogue, it is heavily implied that he can't satisfy his wife.

Production

Development and writing
The film was known as The Set Up and was based on a script by Randy Feldman which was based on an idea by Jon Peters and Peter Guber. Sylvester Stallone and Patrick Swayze were signed to star. In March 1989 Andrei Konchalovsky signed to direct. After Swayze dropped out and went on to star in Road House, he was replaced by Kurt Russell.

Sylvester Stallone had the original director of photography, Barry Sonnenfeld, fired. Donald E. Thorin, who had shot Stallone's movie Lock Up earlier that year, was Sonnenfeld's replacement.

Pre-production
After nearly three months of filming, director Andrei Konchalovsky was fired by producer Jon Peters in a dispute over the movie's ending. In his 1999 book of memoirs, Elevating Deception, Konchalovsky said that the reason he was fired was because he and Stallone wanted to give the film a more serious tone and make it more realistic than the producers wanted, especially Jon Peters, who kept pushing for the film to be goofier and campier, and as such, his relationship with Peters became untenable.

Another reason why Konchalovsky was fired was his refusal to agree to what he referred to as the "increasingly insane" demands that Peters had. Konchalovsky said that he was initially hired to make a buddy cop movie with plenty of humor, but Peters basically wanted to turn it into a spoof, without any semblance of seriousness, and Konchalovsky refused. Essentially, Konchalovsky argued that they were simply trying to make two different movies, and when Peters realized his inability to bend Konchalovsky to his will, he fired him. According to supporting actor Brion James (in a 1999 interview with Louis Paul), the film was in disarray from the very beginning and by the half-way point of the shoot, when the film was several months behind schedule, Peters and Konchalovsky were no longer speaking.

James agreed that the official reason Konchalovsky was fired was because of the budget, but he also said that going over budget was not Konchalovsky's fault, and that Konchalovsky did not deserve to be fired. Konchalovsky, however, had nothing but praise for Sylvester Stallone, and both he and James said that despite Stallone's ego and decision to fire the original cinematographer, and the fact that he had a hand in Konchalovsky's firing, Stallone was the one person who held the project together, and that he was a constant voice of reason on an increasingly chaotic set. According to Konchalovsky, by the end of principal photography, Stallone was unofficially working as producer, director and writer, as well as star, and Konchalovsky believes that had it not been for Stallone, Peters would have fired him much sooner than he did. Production sources said that Konchalovsky had been given impossible scheduling demands, and was then made the scapegoat when he fell behind.

The director was replaced with Albert Magnoli, who filmed all the chase and fight scenes in the ending.

Reportedly, executive producer Peter MacDonald, who was also one of the film's second unit directors, took over directing the movie before Magnoli was brought in. (A year earlier, MacDonald had to step in as director on Stallone's previous movie, Rambo III, after the original director was fired by Stallone.)

There was also a legal battle between producers Peter Guber and Jon Peters and Warner Bros. studio. Guber and Peters complained in Los Angeles Superior Court that Warner had replaced them on the project and, over Peters' objections, "advanced the release date of the film by many months".

The film went into production on June 12, 1989, and was originally scheduled to wrap by August 25, 1989. Filming concluded on October 20, 1989.

Post-production
In late August, the directors were switched and after principal photography was finished in September, replacement director Magnoli called everyone back to the set for two more weeks of additional re-shoots, which included filming a completely new opening sequence. Filming was finally finished on October 20, 1989, eight weeks before its original scheduled theatrical opening in 1600 theatres across the United States.

The movie was racing to make its December 15 release, but due to the Warner Bros. studio's complaints on every different cut that was edited before they approved the final (theatrical) version, it barely made the deadline and ended up being shipped to theaters in "wet prints" – an industry term meaning that it was just barely completed before its release date.

Because Warner Bros. wanted no risk of the same problems with the MPAA as it had had with Cobra, its previous Stallone movie, it ordered the editors to cut some death scenes in the last part of the movie while it was being re-edited, which explain the usage of "jump cuts" every time someone is shot in the movie.

One of the writers who worked on the constantly changing script for the film was Jeffrey Boam, who also worked on the scripts for the Lethal Weapon films. He did a re-write of the script, which he described as being long, incredible and awful, that didn't change anything conceptually. Even though he completed many re-writes, he hated both the script and the film and did not want to be credited for his work.

Behind-the-scenes problems (including filming, script changes, and later constant cuts and re-editing of the movie) were so big and so bad that one of the more experienced crew members said in an interview: "This was the worst-organized, most poorly prepared film I've ever been on in my life. From the first day we started, no one knew what the hell anyone was doing." This same crew member also mentioned some reasons why director Konchalovsky was fired; "He found himself in over his head. There were scenes scheduled for three days that were so complicated they should have been scheduled for six or seven days. They were trying to do a 22-week movie in 11 weeks."

The film ultimately missed its budget by over $20 million, and had to be completely re-edited by editor Stuart Baird prior to its theatrical release. Tango & Cash was one of many films to be turned over to Baird, who came onto projects as an editing "doctor" when studios such as Warner Bros. were displeased with the first cut (in this case, second, third, ...) turned in by the filmmakers. Baird was also called in by Warner Bros to re-edit another Stallone action movie, Demolition Man (1993), for the same reasons.

After Baird was brought in by Warner Brothers to save the movie in the editing room, it was he who hired Hubert de La Bouillerie to edit the film and Harold Faltermeyer and Gary Chang to compose the music. Chang provided additional music near the end of the movie, because Faltermeyer could not return to re-score the final reel of the film, as it was constantly being edited because of constant complaints from Warner Bros. Because of the massive re-editing, some plot points and even some action scenes were deleted.

The theatrical trailer was made using the footage from one of the earlier cuts of the movie. This is why it shows some deleted and alternate scenes, which were changed or cut from the movie during the re-editing, which include: an alternate cut of the scene where Tango and Cash first meet in the warehouse; an alternate cut of the shower scene between Tango and Cash; a deleted or alternate fight scene between Cash and a Chinese assassin, during which Cash says "I hate you karate guys"; and a deleted scene in which Tango is reading the newspaper and then pulls out a shotgun and shoots at a car. The trailer also shows extra shots from other scenes.

In a 1999 interview with Louis Paul at the Chiller Theatre Convention, actor Brion James elaborated on his experiences working on Tango & Cash and the film’s production problems:

BJ: TANGO AND CASH, I had two scenes when I started the film. Konchalovsky wanted to work with me for years, he worked for Cannon, they couldn't pay me, so I couldn't work for them. He wanted me to work with him on RUNAWAY TRAIN. Finally, I get to work with him and he calls me in and I meet Stallone and Russell and they say 'Yeah, he's great.' I just had two scenes with these guys, they chase me around, and I get beat up and that's it. So, I get there and I'm acting with Stallone and made my character have a cockney accent just to add something. I said I'm in a movie with all of these guys, how am I going to chew the scenery with all of these fuckers? So, I created the cockney, I'm not just another hit man from Cleveland. They loved it. They played off of it, they got into it. So Stallone started re-writing the script, the script wasn't really ready, but they were there to go, so when you got to go, you go. The script was ready, and when it was not, he would fix it. The film was twenty million dollars over budget and I wound up being on the film for fourteen weeks. My part went from a few days, to much bigger. So, I became the main bad guy, and not Jack Palance.

LP: Konchalovsky lost that picture, didn't he?

BJ: He did a great job, but Sly got him fired. Sly is very protective about his films. He got his own DP in, and the film went twenty million dollars over budget. So the studio had to justify it, and fired him, saying it was the director's fault. It wasn't his fault. They didn't have a script. I was even re-writing at the end of the day, over and over. They only had three weeks left and they brought in Albert Magnoli. He did rock videos and a Prince movie (PURPLE RAIN). They gave this guy three quarters of a million dollars to do three weeks. By the time he got there, I was like don't talk to me, stay back. I knew this character for weeks, I know what I'm doing. It wound up being a great film, that eventually made a lot of money. It's one of the biggest pirated videos in the history of Russia. There were 80,000 pirated copies. Warner Bros. was crazy not to market it properly, but that film was huge. I went to the Ukraine when I was shooting another film, and I was mobbed. I was in the Black Sea and I had no idea that people even knew who I was.

Stallone later said "I had a lot of great times on that film. Kurt nailed some of those scenes, like the pro he is."

Speaking on both Konchalovsky and Magnoli, Stallone also said:

Andrei was a real gentleman and I thought his take on "Tango and Cash" was very good and would've been infinitely more realistic had he been allowed to continue. His replacement was more attuned to comic pop culture so the film had a dramatic shift into a more light hearted direction.

Music

A soundtrack was never released, as the songs were already released on the artists' albums. The film score, which was composed by Harold Faltermeyer, was released for the first time on January 30, 2007 by La-La Land Records (LLLCD 1052) in 3000 Limited Sets.

Songs
 "Best of What I Got" – Bad English
 "Let the Day Begin" – The Call
 "Don't Go" – Yazoo
 "Poison" – Alice Cooper
 "It's No Crime" – Kenneth "Babyface" Edmonds
 "Harlem Nocturne" – Darktown Strutters

Reception

Box office
The film opened on December 22, 1989, and during its opening weekend, the movie grossed $6.6 million from 1,409 theaters, averaging $4,704 per theater, and ranking #2 at the box office. The film saw its $54 million production budget return box office receipts of $120.4 million. The film also sold well on VHS. On the website The Dissolve, the film was reviewed by Nathan Rabin for his "Forgotbusters" column, which consists of Rabin analyzing how films that were among the top 25 grossing titles of a given year have not had lasting cultural influence. Rabin said that there was more affection and attention to Tango & Cash than he had expected, based on feedback from people who had seen the film since 1990.

Critical response
The film has a score of 31% on Rotten Tomatoes based on 48 reviews, and an average rating of 4.4 out of 10. The critical consensus states: "Brutally violent and punishingly dull, this cookie-cutter buddy cop thriller isn't even fun enough to reach 'so bad it's good' status". On Metacritic, the film has a weighted average score of 41 out of 100, based on 15 critics, indicating "mixed or average reviews". The New York Times criticized the plot, the screenplay, and the acting. Michael Wilmington of the Los Angeles Times called it "a waste of talent and energy on all levels", criticizing the film as both illogical and predictable.  Dave Kehr of the Chicago Tribune wrote that one interpretation of the film is "a crafty foreigner's sly parody of the current state of American culture".

Audiences polled by CinemaScore gave the film an average grade of "B+" on an A+ to F scale.

Accolades
Tango & Cash was nominated for three Golden Raspberry Awards for Worst Actor (Sylvester Stallone), Worst Supporting Actress (Kurt Russell in drag) and Worst Screenplay.

In 2012, The Flop House podcast dedicated their 100th episode to Tango & Cash.  They praised it as an enjoyably bad movie and the "last film before irony was created".  Slate later listed the episode as one of "The 25 Best Podcast Episodes Ever".

Potential sequel
In September 2019, Stallone revealed that he has a story written for a potential sequel. The filmmaker stated he is trying to convince Kurt Russell to sign onto the project, though he anticipates the film will be made.

See also
 Police Story (1985) - inspired the scene where Tango stops a speeding truck, causing the driver and passenger to crash through the windshield
 Supercop (1992) - in turn inspired by the scene in which Tango and Cash escape prison by using makeshift zip-lines

References

External links

 The Life and Art of Vern Article; June 21, 2009
 
 
 
 
 
 
 

1989 films
1989 action comedy films
1980s action comedy-drama films
American buddy action films
1980s spy films
American action comedy-drama films
American buddy cop films
American satirical films
1980s English-language films
Fictional duos
Fictional portrayals of the Los Angeles Police Department
Films about drugs
Films about miscarriage of justice
Films directed by Andrei Konchalovsky
Films directed by Albert Magnoli
Films scored by Harold Faltermeyer
Films set in Los Angeles
American police detective films
1980s spy comedy films
Warner Bros. films
1980s buddy comedy films
1980s buddy cop films
Films produced by Jon Peters
Films produced by Peter Guber
1980s satirical films
1980s American films